Abdulla Rzayev (born 12 March 2002) is an Azerbaijani footballer who plays as a defender for Kapaz, on loan from Sabah, in the Azerbaijan Premier League.

Club career
On 20 July 2022, Rzayev joined Shamakhi on loan for the season from Sabah, making his debut in the Azerbaijan Premier League on 27 August 2022 against Qarabağ.

On 3 January 2023, Rzayev was recalled from his loan deal with Shamakhi, and then joined Kapaz on loan for the remainder of the season.

References

External links
 

2002 births
Living people
Association football defenders
Azerbaijani footballers
Azerbaijan youth international footballers
Azerbaijan under-21 international footballers
Azerbaijan Premier League players
Sabah FC (Azerbaijan) players
Shamakhi FK players